White Oak Independent School District is a public school district based in White Oak, Texas (USA).  The district covers most of the town of White Oak as well as a small portion of Clarksville City.

In 2009, the school district was rated "recognized" by the Texas Education Agency.

Schools
White Oak High (Grades 9-12)
White Oak Middle (Grades 6-8)
White Oak Intermediate (Grades 3-5)
White Oak Primary (Grades PK-2)

References

External links
White Oak ISD

School districts in Gregg County, Texas